

 
Mount Bundey  is a locality in the Northern Territory of Australia located about  east of the territory capital of Darwin.

The locality consists of land bounded to the north by the Arnhem Highway and to the east by the Kakadu National Park.  The locality is named from a hill named Mount Bundey which itself is named after the cadastral unit of the Hundred of Bundey.  Its boundaries and name were gazetted on 4 April 2007.

The Mount Bundey Training Area, an Australian Defence Force facility, occupies the eastern side of the locality.

The 2016 Australian census which was conducted in August 2016 reports that Mount Bundey  had 33 people living within its boundaries.

Mount Bundey  is located within the federal division of Lingiari, the territory electoral division of Goyder and within the unincorporated areas of the Northern Territory.

References

 Places in the unincorporated areas of the Northern Territory